The discography of Dutch DJ duo W&W includes one studio album, two compilation albums, and sixty-five singles, including ten charting singles.

Albums

Studio albums

Compilation albums

Singles

As W&W

Charted singles

Other singles

as NWYR

Productions

Production and songwriting credits

2009:
 ElSandro – "Style Fusion"
 Quintin vs. DJ Jean – "Original Dutch"

2011:
 Renvo – "Break Out"
 ElSandro – "Merriment"

2012:
 Renvo – "Energize"
 Jochen Miller – "Zodiac"
 Jochen Miller – "Nevada"
 Quintin – "Toy Story"

2015:
 VINAI – "Techno"
 Dustin Lenji – "Gladiator"

2016:
 Hardwell feat. Jake Reese – "Run Wild"

Remixes

As lead artist
2008
 M6 – "Fade 2 Black"
 Sied van Riel – "Riel People Know"

2009
 Armin van Buuren – "Rain"
 Leon Bolier and Galen Behr – "Acapulco"
 Ørjan Nilsen – "Artic Globe"

2010
 Aly & Fila – "My Mind Is With You"
 Scott Mac – "Damager 02"
 Svenson & Gielen – "The Beauty of Silence"
 J.O.C. – "Botnik"

2011
 Sean Tyas – "Banshee"
 Marcel Woods – "Champagne Dreams"

2012
 Dash Berlin featuring Emma Hewitt – "Waiting"

2013
 Armin van Buuren featuring Trevor Guthrie – "This Is What It Feels Like"
 Krewella – "Live for the Night"
Nico & Vinz - "Am I Wrong"

2014
 Gareth Emery featuring Bo Bruce – "U"
 Duke Dumont featuring Jax Jones – "I Got U"
 Dimitri Vegas & Like Mike, Diplo & Fatboy Slim featuring Bonde Do Role & Pin – "Eparrei"
 Mark Sixma – "Shadow"

2015
 Timmy Trumpet – "Freaks"
 Zombie Nation – "Kernkraft 400"
 Axwell Λ Ingrosso – "Sun Is Shining"
 Hardwell featuring Mr. Probz – "Birds Fly"
 DJ Snake and Dillon Francis – "Get Low"
Stardust - "Music Sounds Better With You"
Jack Ü (Skrillex & Diplo) feat. Justin Bieber - Where Are Ü Now (w/ Dimitri Vegas & Like Mike)
Justin Bieber - Sorry
Ariana Grande - One Last Time
Kygo - Stole the Show

2016
 The Chainsmokers featuring Daya – "Don't Let Me Down"
 Mike Posner – "I Took a Pill in Ibiza"
 DJ Snake - "Propaganda"
Dr. Dre and Snoop Dogg - "Still D.R.E." 
Martin Garrix and Bebe Rexha - "In the Name of Love"
Coldplay featuring Beyoncé - "Hymn For The Weekend"

2017
 Pikotaro – "PPAP"

2018
 Steve Aoki and BTS – "Waste It on Me"

2020
 The Weeknd - "Blinding Lights"
 Alan Walker - "Faded"
 Da Boy Tommy featuring Da Rick - "Candyman" (with Dimitri Vegas & Like Mike and Ummet Ozcan)

2021
O-Zone - "Dragostea Din Tei"
 Justin Bieber - "Hold On"

As NWYR
2017:
 Ed Sheeran - "Castle on the Hill"
 Gareth Emery and Standerwick - "Saving Light"
Calvin Harris feat. Ayah Marar - "Flashback"
 Above & Beyond featuring Richard Bedford - Northern Soul
Phil Collins - "In The Air Tonight"

2019 

 Billie Eilish - When The Party's Over

2020 

 Rüfüs Du Sol - Underwater
Safri Duo - Played-A-Live (The Bongo Song)

References

Discographies of Dutch artists